The 1971 Livingston Tigers football team was an American football team that represented Livingston University (later renamed the University of West Alabama) in the Gulf South Conference (GSC) during the 1971 NAIA Division I football season. In their second season under head coach Mickey Andrews, the Tigers compiled an 11–1 record (5–1 against conference opponents) and shared the GSC championship with Troy State.

At the end of the season, Andrews was named GSC Coach of the Year, and quarterback Clemit Spruiell was named GSC Offensive Player of the Year. Four Livingston players were named to the All-GSC team: Spruiell; linebacker Nels Strickland; defensive tackle Herbie Malone; and defensive end Adrian Gant.

Schedule

References

Livingston Tigers
West Alabama Tigers football seasons
NAIA Football National Champions
Gulf South Conference football champion seasons
Livingston Tigers football